The Severed Man is a novella written by George Mann which is the fifth in the series of Time Hunter novellas and features the characters Honoré Lechasseur and Emily Blandish from Daniel O'Mahony's Doctor Who novella The Cabinet of Light, although the series is not formally connected to the Doctor Who fictional universe.

The novella is also available in a limited edition hardback, signed by the author.

References

External links
 Telos Publishing - The Severed Man

Time Hunter
2004 British novels
Novels by George Mann (writer)